The city of Portland, Maine, is the hub city of a metropolitan area in southern Maine, United States. The region is commonly known as Greater Portland or the Portland metropolitan area. For statistical purposes, the U.S. federal government defines three different representations of the Portland metropolitan area. The Portland–South Portland–Biddeford, Maine, metropolitan statistical area is a region consisting of three counties in Maine, anchored by the city of Portland and the smaller cities of South Portland and Biddeford. As of the 2010 census, the MSA had a population of 514,098. A larger combined statistical area (CSA), the Portland–Lewiston–South Portland combined statistical area, is defined as the combination of this metropolitan statistical area (MSA) with the adjacent Lewiston–Auburn MSA. The CSA comprises four counties in southern Maine. The Portland–South Portland metropolitan New England city and town area is defined on the basis of cities and towns rather than entire counties. It consists of most of Cumberland and York counties plus the town of Durham in Androscoggin County. The Greater Portland area has emerged as an important center for the creative economy, which is also bringing gentrification.

Metropolitan statistical area

Components
The Portland–South Portland–Biddeford Metropolitan Statistical Area MSA is defined as consisting of Cumberland, Sagadahoc, and York counties. Portland, South Portland, and Biddeford are the three largest cities in this area and are defined as principal cities of the MSA. Other cities in the MSA are:
Bath
Saco
Sanford
Westbrook

Towns in the three-county MSA are: 

Acton
Alfred
Arrowsic
Arundel
Baldwin
Berwick
Bowdoin
Bowdoinham
Bridgton
Brunswick
Buxton
Cape Elizabeth
Casco
Chebeague Island
Cornish
Cumberland
Dayton
Eliot
Falmouth
Freeport
Frye Island

Georgetown
Gorham
Gray
Harpswell
Harrison
Hollis
Kennebunk
Kennebunkport
Kittery
Lebanon
Limerick
Limington
Long Island
Lyman
Naples
New Gloucester
Newfield
North Berwick
North Yarmouth
Ogunquit

Old Orchard Beach
Parsonsfield
Phippsburg
Pownal
Raymond
Richmond
Sanford
Scarborough
Sebago
Shapleigh
South Berwick
Standish
Topsham
Waterboro
Wells
West Bath
Windham
Woolwich
Yarmouth
York

Census-designated places in the MSA are:

Berwick
Bridgton
Brunswick
Brunswick Station
Cape Neddick
Cumberland Center
Falmouth Foreside
Freeport
Gorham
Kennebunk
Kennebunkport
Kittery
Kittery Point
Lake Arrowhead
Little Falls

North Berwick
North Windham
Old Orchard Beach
Richmond
Sanford
Scarborough
South Eliot
South Sanford
South Windham
Springvale
Topsham
West Kennebunk
Yarmouth
York Harbor

The MSA includes one unorganized territory, the town of Perkins.

Demographics

As of the 2010 census, the MSA had a population of 514,098.

Ten years earlier, as of the census of 2000, there were 487,568 people, 196,669 households, and 128,201 families residing within the MSA. The racial makeup of the MSA was 96.49% White, 0.80% African American, 0.27% Native American, 1.09% Asian, 0.04% Pacific Islander, 0.28% from other races, and 1.03% from two or more races. Hispanic or Latino of any race were 0.87% of the population.

As of the 2000 census, the median income for a household in the MSA was $43,195, and the median income for a family was $51,873. Males had a median income of $35,402 versus $26,213 for females. The per capita income for the MSA was $21,851.

Combined statistical area
The Portland–Lewiston–South Portland Combined Statistical Area is made up of four counties in Maine. The statistical area includes two metropolitan statistical areas. As of the 2000 Census, the CSA had a population of 591,361 (a July 1, 2009 estimate placed the population at 623,365).

Components
Metropolitan statistical areas:
Portland-South Portland-Biddeford (Cumberland, Sagadahoc, and York counties)
Lewiston-Auburn (Androscoggin County)

New England city and town areas
An alternative federal government delineation of Portland's metropolitan area is the Portland–South Portland, ME Metropolitan New England City and Town Area. A New England City and Town Area (NECTA) is typically a finer-grained definition of a metropolitan area because it is based on cities and towns rather than entire counties. The Portland–South Portland NECTA consists of 24 cities and towns in Cumberland County, 14 cities and towns in York County, and the town of Durham in Androscoggin County.

Other parts of the Southern Maine region are identified as components of other NECTAs. The towns of Sanford and Shapleigh in York County form the Sanford, Maine, Micropolitan NECTA. The Brunswick, Maine, Micropolitan NECTA consists of two towns in Cumberland County, one city and eight towns in Sagadahoc County, and three towns in Lincoln County. Two metropolitan NECTAs centered in New Hampshire, the Dover-Durham, NH-ME Metropolitan NECTA (anchored by the principal cities of Dover and Durham, New Hampshire) and the Portsmouth, NH-ME Metropolitan NECTA (anchored by Portsmouth, New Hampshire) each include three York County towns. The Lewiston-Auburn Metropolitan NECTA is defined as including 11 Androscoggin County cities and towns, as well as four towns in Oxford County and one in Kennebec County.

Similar to a CSA, the Portland–Lewiston–South Portland Combined NECTA is defined to consist of the Portland–South Portland and Lewiston–Auburn Metropolitan NECTAs and the Brunswick and Sanford Micropolitan NECTAs. The three York County towns that are included in the Portsmouth, New Hampshire Metropolitan NECTA are, however, considered to be part of the Boston–Worcester–Providence, MA–RI–NH–CT–ME Combined NECTA.

The state of Maine uses NECTAs as one basis for defining labor market areas for purposes of compiling and reporting statistics on employment and unemployment. Labor market area definitions used for the Portland area include the Portland–South Portland–Biddeford Metropolitan Area, the Sanford Micropolitan Area, and the combination of these two areas, known as Portland–South Portland–Sanford combined statistical area.

See also
Maine census statistical areas

References

 
Metropolitan areas of Maine
Geography of Cumberland County, Maine
Geography of York County, Maine
Geography of Sagadahoc County, Maine
Demographics of Maine
.
Northeast megalopolis